Videograms of a Revolution is a 1992 documentary film compiled by Harun Farocki and Andrei Ujică from over 125 hours  of amateur footage, news footage, and excerpts from the Bucharest TV studio overtaken by demonstrators as part of the December 1989 Romanian Revolution.
In 2004 the Austrian Film Museum selected the documentary as part of its Die Utopie Film program for The Best 100 in Film History list.

External links

References

Documentary films about revolutions
Works about the Romanian Revolution
1992 films
1992 documentary films
German documentary films
Documentary films about Romania
1990s German films